Amandine Chantal Henry (born 28 September 1989) is a French professional footballer who plays as a defensive midfielder for Division 1 Féminine club Lyon and the France national team. Having played in all youth levels, Henry made her senior international debut in 2009. She has captained the national team since October 2017.

Career

Henry began her career in 2004, at the age of 15, at Hénin-Beaumont. After one season, she attended the women's section of the Clairefontaine academy for two seasons.

In 2007, at the age of 18, she joined Lyon, the most successful women's team in France. During her first season with Lyon, she injured the cartilage in her knee, which kept her out of competition for a year and a half. It was a difficult time, and she considered giving up on football, but with the support of her family, she persevered and returned to Lyon.

With Lyon, Henry was featured in the final match of the UEFA Women's Champions League in three consecutive seasons beginning in 2010.

Henry was awarded the Silver Ball Award as the tournament's 2nd Best Player at the 2015 FIFA Women's World Cup. Henry was also named among the best players in Europe in 2015, becoming a finalist in the annual UEFA Best Women's Player in Europe Award, finishing 2nd behind Célia Šašić.

She signed with the Portland Thorns in March 2016 and joined the team in June, where she played in 8 matches and started in 9 for the regular season-winning National Women's Soccer League team.

After undergoing surgery following the NWSL season, she joined Paris Saint-Germain in January 2017, where she played in four Division 1 matches and one Coupe de France Féminine match before rejoining the Thorns in March.

Henry scored her first NWSL goal against Boston on 27 May. Also, in May, she was named to the NWSL Team of the Month. She started in 12 consecutive games between April and July before departing for the UEFA Women's Euro 2017.

During Euro 2017, Henry started in all four games for France. France was ranked #3 in the world. France beat Iceland 1–0 on 18 July. On 22 July, Henry scored the goal that drew the game against Austria 1–1, and on 26 July, France drew Switzerland 1–1. This qualified France to advance to the quarter-finals where they lost to England 1–0 on 30 July. Henry received the player of the match award for the quarter-final match against England.

Henry returned to the Thorns to score in consecutive matches. First she scored against Kansas City on 16 August, converting her first penalty kick for the Thorns. Then, she played 30 minutes as a substitute in the game against the Houston Dash on 19 August, scoring her third goal of the season.

The Thorns finished the 2017 season in second place, advancing to the playoffs where Henry scored the first goal against the third-place team Orlando Pride. Portland defeated Orlando 4–1. Henry became an NWSL champion when the Thorns defeated the regular-season winning team North Carolina Courage 1–0 in the 2017 NWSL Championship on 14 October 2017.

After the 2017 NWSL season, Henry came back to Lyon.

Personal life
Henry was born in Lille and started playing football at the age of 5. There were no girls' teams for such young players, so she played with boys until she was 13 years old.

She is not related to Thierry Henry.

Career statistics

Club

International

International goals

Honours
Lyon
 Division 1 Féminine: 2007–08, 2008–09, 2009–10, 2010–11, 2011–12, 2012–13, 2013–14, 2014–15, 2015–16, 2017–18, 2018–19, 2019–20
 Coupe de France Féminine: 2007–08, 2011–12, 2012–13, 2013–14, 2014–15, 2015–16, 2018–19, 2019–20
 UEFA Women's Champions League: 2010–11, 2011–12, 2015–16, 2017–18, 2018–19, 2019–20

Portland Thorns
 NWSL Championship: 2017
 NWSL Shield: 2016
France
Cyprus Cup: 2014
SheBelieves Cup: 2017
Individual
FIFA Women's World Cup Silver Ball: 2015
FIFA Women's World Cup All-Star Team: 2015
FIFPro: FIFA FIFPro World XI 2015
IFFHS Women's World Team: 2018, 2019
IFFHS UEFA Woman Team of the Decade 2011–2020

References

External links
 
 
 
 
 Lyon club profile 
 Thorns FC club profile
 
 
  
 NWSL profile
 StatsFootoFeminin profile 

1989 births
Living people
Footballers from Lille
French women's footballers
CNFE Clairefontaine players
Olympique Lyonnais Féminin players
Paris Saint-Germain Féminine players
France women's youth international footballers
France women's international footballers
Women's association football midfielders
2015 FIFA Women's World Cup players
Portland Thorns FC players
National Women's Soccer League players
Expatriate women's soccer players in the United States
Footballers at the 2016 Summer Olympics
Olympic footballers of France
Division 1 Féminine players
French expatriate sportspeople in the United States
2019 FIFA Women's World Cup players
FCF Hénin-Beaumont players
UEFA Women's Euro 2017 players
French expatriate women's footballers